Marco Burch (born 19 October 2000) is a Swiss professional footballer who plays as a centre-back for Swiss Super League club FC Luzern.

References

External links
 

Living people
2000 births
Swiss men's footballers
Association football central defenders
Swiss Super League players
FC Luzern players
People from Obwalden